is a 2020 Japanese anime film that is a spin-off of Netflix's Altered Carbon television series. The film is directed by Jō Nakajima and written by Dai Sato and Tsukasa Kondo. Set 253 years before the main events of season 1, and 283 years before the events of season 2, Takeshi Kovacs, on the planet Latimar, must protect a tattooist while investigating the death of a yakuza boss alongside a no-nonsense CTAC.

Altered Carbon: Resleeved was released on March 19, 2020, on Netflix, and received mixed reviews from critics. The animation was praised, but the characters and plot were criticized.

Plot 
On the planet Latimar, Holly is being chased by the yakuzas. She reaches a club, where they finally catch her, but are killed by a ninja. As the ninja is about to kill Holly, he is fought off by Takeshi in his Ken sleeve. Takeshi along with Holly speak with Tanaseda, who wants Takeshi to protect Holly and find out how and why his younger brother died. Holly escapes from Takeshi through a bathroom window, but runs into Gena of UN's CTAC. Takeshi intervenes, holding Gena at gun point before CTAC reinforcements arrive. The group is ambushed and attacked by ninjas who kill Gena's unit. After a short chase, Takeshi and Gena kill all the ninja and Holly reveals the ninjas were sent by Shinji, who was planning a coup in Mizumoto syndicate.

The three head to the Mizumoto syndicate's headquarters and oldest luxury hotel on Latimar, the Wild Geese. There they are met by Ogai, the AI butler of the hotel, who welcomes them. Shinji arrives showing relief that Holly is alive and as an apology for the disrespect his men showed when first arriving, he gives Holly's bodyguards Takeshi and Gena, their most expensive room in the hotel. In the Mizumoto tattoo room, where Holly continues to ink Shinji, Takeshi speaks with Genzo. Here Genzo explains who their founder was and that Tanaseda was his son. Genzo also explains the Mizumoto tradition, when the succession for a new boss occurs, the old one dies along with his stack. Meanwhile Gena reports to CTAC and is revealed to be Reileen Kawahara. Takeshi reports in with Tanaseda, but he cannot believe his father would give his life in a succession and instructs Takeshi to continue protecting Holly until the succession.

Takeshi finds Holly watching an old memory of her parents being murdered. Since their stacks were not destroyed, she needs the Mizumoto clans help finding them. In the meantime, Shinji speaks with his ninjas, annoyed they could not kill a child. While travelling to Genzo; Holly, Takeshi and Gena are accompanied by an additional group of yakuza for protection. They are attacked again by two ninja wearing bullet-proof armour, who kill all the yakuza and stab Gena, before Takeshi and Gena kill them. As other ninjas approach, they head to the hotel foyer and meet Ogai, who activates the hotels defense system, killing the remaining ninja. Holly reveals that the tattooist Margot had created a tattoo program that is passed on the next boss and on succession, kills the previous boss along with his stack.

Back in their room, Gena hears Takeshi singing and realizes that he is her brother, but did not reveal herself. Takeshi speaks with Tanaseda and after mentioning Genzo's laugh, Tanaseda discovers something and gives new orders to Takeshi, which he carries out confirming Tanaseda's suspicions. On the day of the succession, a firework exploding and a short blackout occurs, during which Holly goes missing. Shinji sees this as the perfect timing and orders the ninja to go and kill Holly and her bodyguards. Genzo arrives shortly after and tells Shinji the succession will happen early to avoid any problems. Holly then appears and drugs Shinji, knocking him out. In the meantime, Takeshi, Gena and the yakuza are surrounded by ninja; Takeshi promises to tell the yakuza the truth of what is happening after they defeat the ninja.

On the succession stage, Genzo's tattoo is activated and kills along with his stack. Tanaseda reveals himself in the digital crowd, revealing that Shinji and Genzo were both his father and founder of the syndicate, who has taken over the bodies of the new bosses for generations. It is revealed that Holly erased Shinji's stack and transferred Genzo's into Shinji's body, confirming that Genzo is indeed the founder. Following orders, Ogai removes the audience and the Founder continues the succession ceremony, but discovers Holly trying to activate the destruction program to kill him. Holly reveals she knows he has her parents stacks, as the Founder throws the two stacks to the ground and destroys them. The yakuza members arrive at the ceremony with Takeshi and Gena, knowing everything and how the Founder has deceived the clan. The yakuza follow the Founder behind the ceremony stage, but they are killed by the Founder in a power suit. Takeshi and Gena fight the Founder, but are no match for him. Tanaseda arrives and tells Ogai to review information he has sent to the hotel system, who after checking it, confirms that Shinji is not the rightful leader, thus launching an attack against the Founder using the fireworks and causing the ceremony stage to collapse. The Founder survives and continues his attack against Takeshi, but after Gena's intervention, Takeshi manages to stab the Founder and destroy his armour. In a fist fight, Takeshi gains the upper hand over the Founder, breaking his arms and legs. Holly then activates the tattoo program, which starts to destroy the Founder. He begs Tanaseda for help, but Tanaseda shoots the Founder's stack and then Shinji's head as his last act of kindness towards his father.

Gena (who had received orders to "get rid of Holly"), reports to CTAC she has completed her mission successfully and then takes her leave. Ogai reveals Holly is Margot and asks her if she wants to change to a younger sleeve as this one is getting taller, but Holly decides to remain in this one so that Takeshi and Gena can recognize her when she gets older if they meet again. Takeshi speaks with Tanaseda, who advises there are more jobs to complete.

Cast 

Trevor Devall, Richard Epcar, Doug Erholtz, Todd Haberkorn, Kyle Hebert, Julie Ann Taylor, and Ezra Weisz provided additional voices in the English version.

Reception 
On Rotten Tomatoes, Altered Carbon: Resleeved has an approval rating of  based on reviews from  critics.

David Griffin of IGN gave the film 6 out of 10 and stated, "Altered Carbon: Resleeved is a diverting entry in the Takeshi Kovacs saga that excels in the action department while neglecting to fully develop its main characters in a way that makes a lasting impact." John Serba of Decider gave the film a positive review and stated, "Altered Carbon: Resleeved won't knock anyone's socks off, but it effectively pleases newcomers and hardcores alike." Courtney Lanning of Arkansas Democrat-Gazette recommended the film as a "solid watch for fans of the live-action series. It expands the universe a little bit in some pleasant ways." Michael Ahr of Den of Geek gave the film 3.5 out of 5 and stated, "The techno-orientalism aspects of the Altered Carbon universe serve this anime version well despite its predictable storyline."

Paul Tassi of Forbes gave the film a negative review and stated, "Perhaps the weirdest part about Altered Carbon: Resleeved is its non-traditional, three-dimensional animation style that make it look like a video game you cannot interact with. Its action soars, but its story and writing fall flat." Hogan Reviews gave the film 3 out of 5 and stated, "There were some well animated fight scenes, but there was also some poor writing and characterization, as well as plenty of "janky" animation in between the good bits."

References

External links 
 

2020 films
2020 anime films
Films set on fictional planets
Yakuza films